Kody Blois  (born January 17, 1991) is a Canadian politician who was elected to represent the riding of Kings—Hants in the House of Commons of Canada as a member of the Liberal Party in the 2019 Canadian federal election. Kody is currently the Chair of the Standing Committee on Agriculture and Agri-Foods

Electoral record

References

External links

Living people
Liberal Party of Canada MPs
Members of the House of Commons of Canada from Nova Scotia
1991 births
21st-century Canadian politicians
21st-century Canadian lawyers
Schulich School of Law alumni
Saint Mary's University (Halifax) alumni
Brock University alumni
People from Hants County, Nova Scotia